Proamphiuma is an extinct genus of prehistoric amphibian found in the Bug Creek Anthills in the Hell Creek Formation.

See also 
 Prehistoric amphibian
 List of prehistoric amphibians

References

Bibliography 
  

Prehistoric amphibians
Cretaceous amphibians of North America
Cretaceous United States
Hell Creek fauna
Fossils of New Jersey
Cretaceous–Paleogene boundary